Borisovo is a rural locality (a village) in Prilukskoye Rural Settlement, Vologodsky District, Vologda Oblast, Russia. The population was 3 as of 2002.

Geography 
The distance to Vologda is 25 km, to Dorozhnoye is 10 km. Velikoye, Arkhipovo, Mezhdurechye are the nearest rural localities.

References 

Rural localities in Vologodsky District